Vitaliy Mykolayovych Ponomarenko (born 23 January 1969) is a former Ukrainian professional footballer.

Club career
He made his professional debut in 1988 for FC Dynamo Kyiv in the USSR Federation Cup.

Honours
 Ukrainian Premier League champion: 1993, 1994.
 Ukrainian Cup winner: 1993.

References

1969 births
Footballers from Kyiv
Living people
Soviet footballers
Ukrainian footballers
Association football defenders
FC Dynamo Kyiv players
FC Ros Bila Tserkva players
FC Dynamo-2 Kyiv players
FC Arsenal Kyiv players
FC Tyumen players
FC Elista players
Ukrainian Premier League players
Ukrainian First League players
Russian Premier League players
Ukrainian expatriate footballers
Expatriate footballers in Russia
Ukrainian expatriate sportspeople in Russia